Yal Dagarmani (also Romanized as Yal Dagarmānī; also known as Takleh, Yal Dagīrmānī, and Yaldakarmānī) is a village in Ojarud-e Sharqi Rural District, Muran District, Germi County, Ardabil Province, Iran. At the 2006 census, its population was 224, in 43 families.

References 

Towns and villages in Germi County